Sonderkommando Rote Kapelle was a German special commission that was created by German High Command in November 1942, in response to the capture of two leading members of a Soviet espionage group that operated in Europe, that was called the Red Orchestra (German:Rote Kapelle) by the Abwehr. The Sonderkommando Rote Kapelle was an internal counter-intelligence operation run by the Abwehr and the Gestapo. It consisted of a small independent Gestapo unit that was commanded by SS-Obersturmbannführer Friedrich Panzinger and its chief investigator was Gestapo officer Karl Giering. Its remit was to discover and arrest members of the Red Orchestra in Germany, Belgium, France, Netherlands, Switzerland and Italy during World War II.

Archival history
While some documents on the "Rote Kapelle Special Commission Commission" are available, others for example, from the Military Historical Archives in Prague and Moscow have not been examined. At the same time, none of the former Gestapo or Abwehr personnel made reports after the war, for obvious reasons. This means that the history of the Sonderkommando Rote Kapelle is only partially complete.

Name
The name Rote Kapelle was a cryptonym that was used by the Reich Security Main Office (RSHA), the security and counter-espionage part of the Schutzstaffel (SS), which referred to resistance radio operators as "pianists", their transmitters as "pianos", and their supervisors as "conductors". The Rote Kapelle was a collective name that was used by the Gestapo, the German secret police, for the purpose of identification, and the Funkabwehr, the German radio counterintelligence organisation. The name of Kapelle was an accepted Abwehr term to denote secret radio transmitters and the counterintelligence operation against them.

Size and location
The Sonderkommando was small organisation of around 12–15 investigators that included two typists. When it moved to Paris, it was located in the third floor in four rooms (335-339) of the French ministry of the interior at 11 Rue des Saussaies. As a unit, they are not Gestapo officials and wear suit and ties to work to enable them operate clandestinely.

Formation
On 26 June 1941, a radio transmission was intercepted that had been detected by the Funkabwehr, the German radio counterintelligence organisation in Brussels. This was the first of many. In August 1941, when the Abwehr realised the nature of the signals, they created a counterintelligence operation with the name Rote Kapelle that was started by Abwehrstelle Belgium (Ast Belgium), a field office of Abwehr IIIF. In October–November 1941, Abwehr officer Henry Piepe was ordered to take charge of the investigation. Piepe became the liaison between the Sonderkommando and the IIIF.

By September 1941, over 250 messages had been intercepted. On 30 November 1941, close range direction-finding teams moved into Brussels and as a result of Piepe's work, almost immediately found three transmitter signals. Piepe chose a location at 101 Rue des Atrébates, that provided the strongest signal. The house was raided by the Abwehr on 12 December 1941 where they found Soviet agent Anatoly Gurevich's transmitter and arrested radio operators Mikhail Makarov and his assistant Anton Danilov. On the 30 July 1942, the Funkabwehr identified a further house at 12 Rue de Namur, Brussels and raided it  As well as arresting Soviet agent and radio specialist Johann Wenzel,  two messages that were waiting to be encyphered were discovered in the house that contained details of such startling content, the plans for Case Blue, that Henry Piepe immediately drove to Berlin from Brussels to report to German High Command.

The start of the Sonderkommando Rote Kapelle cannot be precisely established. Walter Schellenberg, recorded details in his memoirs of an agreement that came about between Fritz Thiele, Wilhelm Canaris, Heinrich Müller and himself in the summer of 1942, to establish a "special commission" to investigate the problem. German counter-intelligence spent months assembling the data and finally Wilhelm Vauck, a cryptanalyst in the Abwehr succeeded in decrypting around 200 of the captured messages. On 15 July 1942, Vauck decrypted a message that was dated 10 October 1941. and addressed to Kent, (Anatoly Gurevich) that gave the addresses of several individuals of German nationality. This resulted in another meeting between Schellenberg,  Thiele, Canaris and Müller where it was decided that the investigation should include Germany and that the Belgium and the Low Countries investigation would continue to be carried out jointly by the Gestapo and the Abwehr, while the German investigation would be carried out only by the Gestapo. In July 1942, the investigation was transferred from Ast Belgium to Section IV. A.2. of the Sicherheitsdienst. After the arrest of Leopold Trepper and Anatoly Gurevich, a small independent Gestapo unit, known as the "Sonderkommando Rote Kapelle" was established in Paris, France in November 1942. The Belgium investigation was conducted by Karl Giering. The Berlin investigation was led by Horst Kopkow.

Operations

Brussels
In Berlin, the Gestapo was ordered to assist Henry Piepe and they selected Giering, who took what reports Piepe had and took over the investigation in Brussels Giering's investigation linked the name Carlos Alamos with GRU officer Mikhail Makarov, who had been arrested during the Rue des Atrébates raid. On Giering's instructions, Makarov was taken to Berlin to undergo interrogation. Instead of being sent to Breendonk or a concentration camp, he was taken to Giering's home, where Giering hoped the homely environment would make him talk. However, Makarov never exposed any details of the network and he was sent back to Saint-Gilles prison in Brussels.

Giering then turned to Rita Arnould as the new lead in the investigation and she identified the Polish-Jewish forger Abraham Rajchmann. Rajchmann was an informer to the Belgian Police Judiciaire des Parquets (Judiciary Police) and it been him who had been forging identity documents in the secret room of 101 Rue des Atrébates. Rajchmann in turn betrayed Soviet agent Konstantin Jeffremov who was arrested on 22 July 1942 in Brussels, while attempting to obtain forged identity documents for himself.

Jeffremov was to be tortured but agreed to cooperate and gave up several important members of the espionage network in Belgium and the Netherlands. Eventually Jeffremov began to work for the Sonderkommando in a Funkspiel operation. Through Jeffremov, contact was made with Germaine Schneider, a courier who worked for the group between Brussels and Paris. However, Schneider contacted Leopold Trepper, the technical director of Soviet Red Army Intelligence in western Europe, to warn him. Trepper advised Schneider to sever all contact with Jeffremov and move to a hideout in Lyons.  Giering instead focused on Germaine Schneider's husband Franz Schneider. In November 1942, Franz Schneider was interrogated by Giering but as he was not part of the network he was not arrested. Schneider managed to inform Trepper that Jeffremov had been arrested.

Rajchmann was arrested by Piepe on 2 September 1942 when his usefulness as an informer to the Abwehr was at an end. Rajchmann also decided to cooperate with the Abwehr resulting in his betrayal of his mistress, the  Comintern member Malvina Gruber, who was arrested on 12 October 1942. Gruber immediately decided to cooperate with the Abwehr, in an attempt to avoid interrogation. She admitted the existence of Soviet agent Anatoly Gurevich and his probable location, as well as exposing several members of the Trepper espionage network in France.

As part of the routine investigation, Harry Piepe discovered that the firm Simexco in Brussels was being used as a cover for Soviet espionage operations by the Trepper network. It was used as a means to generate monies that could be used in day-to-day operations by the espionage group unbeknownst to the employees of the company and at the same time provide travel documentation and facilities for European wide telephone communication between group members. Piepe was concerned about the large number of telegrams the company was sending to Berlin, Prague and Paris and decided to investigate it. Piepe visited the Chief Commissariat Officer for Brussels, who was responsible for the company. In the meeting Piepe showed the two photographs that had been discovered at the house at 101 Rue des Atrébates, to the commanding officer who immediately identified the aliases of Leopold Trepper and Anatoly Gurevich. As part of a combined operation with Giering in Paris, Piepe raided the offices of Simexco on the 19 November 1942. When the Gestapo entered the Simexco office they found only one person, a clerk, but managed to discover all the names and addresses of Simexco employees and shareholders from company records. Over the month of November, most of the people associated with the company were arrested and taken to St. Gilles Prison in Brussels or Fort Breendonk in Mechelen.

Netherlands
On 25 July 1942, the Dutch agent Maurice Peper was arrested by Piepe in Brussels. Between late 1940 and July 1942 Peper worked first for Gurevich and then Jeffremov as courier who operated between Johann Wenzel in Brussels and Anton Winterink in Amsterdam. He was betrayed by Jeffremov, who informed the Sonderkommando of a covert meeting to be held in a Brussels street by Peper and Hermann Isbutzki. Peper agreed to work for the Sonderkommando after being tortured and revealed that he was to meet Anton Winterink a few days later in Amsterdam. Piepe escorted Peper to Amsterdam who allowed Peper to attend the meeting. On 18 or 19 August 1942 (sources vary), Winterink was arrested  by Piepe at the meeting in cafe in Amsterdam. A total of 17 people from Winterink's group were arrested and a radio transmitter was seized from Winterink's apartment. Winterink was taken to Brussels where he was tortured for two weeks before he agreed to work for the Sonderkommando. On 22 September 1942, Winterink began a funkspiel operation under the name "Beam Tanne.

Peper also betrayed Auguste Sésée, the reserve radio operator in the Jeffremov network, who was arrested in August 1942.   He was initially sent to Saint-Gilles prison in Brussels and then taken to Berlin where he was beheaded in January 1944.

Berlin

In Berlin, the Gestapo had been monitoring the movements and telephone calls Harro and Libertas Schulze-Boysen as well as Greta and Adam Kuckhoff along with Arvid and Mildred Harnack since July 1942 and had their telephones tapped. Horst Heilmann had been in contact by telephone with Harro Schulze-Boysen and Waldemar Lentz to warn them that they were likely being watched and this hastened the start of the Gestapo operation to arrest the group.  Harro Schulze-Boysen was the first of the Berlin group to the arrested on 31 August 1942 and he was taken under "house arrest" (Hausgefängnis) to the Gestapo HQ at 8 Prinz Albrecht Street where he was interrogated by Kriminalkommissar . Strübing used the typical gamut of Gestapo techniques for interrogation that included physical threats, blackmail, flattery, the presentation of fake and real evidence of wrongdoing and torture.

On the 5 September 1942 Heilmann was arrested and shortly after on the 8th, Libertas Schulze-Boysen was arrested. Gestapo Kriminalsekretär Alfred Göpfert was assigned to interrogate Libertas Schulze-Boysen. Göpfert used subterfuge in the form of Gertrud Breiter, a Gestapo secretary who worked in Department IV E-6 to befriend Schulze-Boysen and then inform on her. Breiter used deceit to convince Schulze-Boysen that she was hostile to her superiors and that Göpfert didn't have any serious evidence against her and due to her family connections with Hermann Göring, her life would be safe. Schulze-Boysen began to believe that Breiter was a friend. She confided in her many details of the resistance but also tried to use Breiter to warn her friends, which sealed her fate.

The next couple to be picked up by the Gestapo were the Harnacks, who were arrested on 7 September 1942 while they were on holiday Preila on the Curonian Spit.
 The Harnacks were interrogated by Kriminalinspektor Walter Habecker. Habecker was an older officer, a bald-headed thug of the old school who was under the command of Horst Kopkow, who was 17 years younger. He had been ordered to use "Enhanced interrogation", (Verschärfte Vernehmung) on prisoners  and if that was not effective he had been ordered to take further necessary action as needed. Habecker was known for using two particularly brutal torture techniques. The first was known as "Hanging", where the prisoner had their hands tied behind their knees and then they were hung on a ladder and then whipped. The second was known as the "Tibetan Prayer Windmill" where pencil-sized pieces of wood, that he called "chopsticks", were inserted between the fingers and the fingers squeezed together. It was said to cause intense pain.

After the first six arrests the Gestapo had obtained sufficient information to begin an operation to arrest as many as possible. Between 12 and 16 September 1942, another 35 people were arrested and taken to either the prison at Gestapo HQ or to the city jail on Alexanderplatz. In this operation, house searches were conducted to look for evidence that could be used to expand the search. For example, when Hannelore Thiel was arrested on 16 September 1942 the search found an amplifying device for a Volksempfänger radio, a KPD pamphlet Organisiert den revolutionären Massenkampf gegen Faschismus und imperialistischen Krieg ("Organize the revolutionary mass struggle against fascism and imperialist war") as well as several books that included Das Kapital by Karl Marx. When Helmut Roloff was captured 17 September 1942, the first radio transmitter built in a suitcase, which was non-functional was recovered by the Gestapo.

The interrogations followed a standard process. Prisoners were interrogated several times in the first few days and their confession recorded onto an auto recording device, for example the Lorenz Textophon. Several days or weeks later the prisoners would be visited by General Judge of the Luftwaffe Manfred Roeder who conducted a shorter, formal interrogation. The prisoner's final statement would then be recorded: "I stand by my statements to the Secret State Police. They correspond to the truth and I make them the subject of my judicial hearing today" The interrogation by Werner Krauss, Heinrich Scheel and Günther Weisenborn were the exception to the standard process as he largely dictated their confession. By the time of the interrogation phase, the Gestapo already knew many of people's names.

The torture and interrogation would often last a particularly long time, even to determine the smallest detail. For example, Wilhelm Guddorf was asked to provide details of three communists that he had met in Sachsenhausen concentration camp in November 1939, while he was imprisoned there. His torture lasted from 15 October to 16 October at 4 a.m.

By the end of October 1942, more than 100 people had been arrested and final reports were being prepared. The Sonderkommando then moved to Hamburg on 15 October 1942, when the RSHA sent Walter Habecker to lead a new investigation using the leads they garnered from the interrogations. Erna Eifler was the first to be arrested on the 15 October. Due to the German tradition of Sippenhaft, the term for the idea that a family or clan shares the responsibility for a crime or act committed by one of its members, meant that many other people who were only tangentially linked were arrested and charged as well. For example, when Eifler was arrested, Heinz Priess who hid her in Hamburg and his mother Marie Priess were also arrested.

Paris
The Abwehr in Brussels and the Sonderkommando  had full control of the Red Orchestra in Belgium and the Netherlands well before the end of 1942 and the Funkspiel was in operation. There is no clear indication as to when Giering, Piepe and the Sonderkommando moved to Paris, although various sources indicate it was either mid-September 1942 or October 1942. Perrault reports it was later summer rather than early autumn. When the unit moved, it relocated to offices in the French ministry of the interior at 11 Rue des Saussaies. Before leaving, Piepe and Giering agreed that Rajchmann would be the best person to take to Paris and find Trepper. When they arrived in Paris, Giering sent Rajchmann out to visit all the dead letterboxes that he knew about, while leaving a message to Trepper to contact him.

However Trepper never showed up. Giering then tried to establish a meeting with a contact, using information from the correspondence between Simexco and an employee of the Paris office of the Belgian Chamber of Commerce. That ultimately proved unsuccessful, so Giering turned back to investigating Simexco. Giering visited the Seine District Commercial Court where he discovered that Léon Grossvogel was a shareholder of Simex. He had been informed by Jeffremov that Grossvogel was one of Trepper's assistants. Giering and Piepe decided to approach Organisation Todt to determine if they could provide a way to identify where Trepper was located. Giering obtained a signed certificate of cooperation from Otto von Stülpnagel, the military commander of occupied France and visited the Todt offices. Giering, together with the organisation commander, created a simple ruse to trap Trepper. However, the ruse failed. Giering decided to start arresting employees of Simex. On 19 November 1942, Suzanne Cointe, a secretary at Simex, and Alfred Corbin the commercial director of the firm, were arrested.  Corbin was interrogated but failed to disclose the location of Monsieur Gilbert, the alias that Trepper was using in his dealings with Simex, so Giering sent for a torture expert. However, Corbin's wife told the Abwehr that Corbin had given Trepper the name of a dentist. After being tortured, Corbin informed Giering of the address of Trepper's dentist. Trepper was subsequently arrested on 24 November by Giering, while he was sitting in a dentist's chair. On the 24 November, Giering contacted Hitler to inform him of the capture of Trepper.

Both Trepper and Gurevich, who had been arrested on 9 November 1942, in Marseilles and brought to Paris, were treated well by Giering, who led the interrogation of Trepper. Trepper informed Giering that his family and relatives in the USSR would be killed if it became known to Soviet intelligence that he had been captured. Giering agreed that should Trepper collaborate, his arrest would remain a secret. Over the next few weeks, Trepper betrayed the names of agents to Giering including Léon Grossvogel, Hillel Katz and several other Soviet agents. According to Piepe, when Trepper talked, it was not out of fear of torture or defeat, but out of duty. While he gave up the names and addresses of most of the members of his own network, he was sacrificing his associates to protect the various members of the French Communist Party, whom he had an absolute belief in. Unlike Trepper, Gurevich refused to name any agents he had recruited.

Under instruction from Heinrich Himmler, Giering established a Funkspiel operation for Trepper and Gurevich in Paris which started in late December and continued until the end of the war.

Over the next eight months, Giering commanded the Sonderkommando in Paris, where the practical work of running the Funkspiel was managed by Gurevich.
 As the months past, Giering became ill with throat cancer and Giering's deputy, Gestapo officer Kriminalkommissar Heinrich Reiser, took over command of Sonderkommando in Paris in June 1943 but the investigation was still under the control of Giering. Reiser formerly took over command of the unit in August 1943, when Giering's throat cancer reached an advanced stage and he had to retire. Reiser was an ineffective officer who returned to Germany to work at the Karlsruhe police station, and he was replaced by Kriminalkommissar Alfred Goepfert, a Gestapo officer. Heinz Pannwitz was employed August 1943 to take over direction of the Sonderkommando investigation operation in France as team leader. Pannwitz had been working in Gestapo HQ in Berlin since the spring of 1943 in the investigation of the Red Orchestra. Trepper stated of the change:

"..that he was glad to see Giering leave and replaced by Pannwitz because, "Giering, with his great skepticism of a policeman, thought that the Jews were not worth more than the others. [Whereas] Pannwitz believed they were worth less than the others"

Sonderkommando Pannwitz
When Pannwitz took over the unit, he changed the work ethos of the unit, such that the political aspect of the investigation was developed at the expense of the operational investigation.

In the process allowing the escape of Leopold Trepper on 13 September 1943.

See also
 Funkabwehr

Notes

References

Citations

Bibliography

External links
 The Funkabwehr

Gestapo
Abwehr operations
Counterintelligence
Reich Security Main Office
Red Orchestra (espionage)